Jiujiufeng is a nature reserve located at the border of Taichung City and Nantou County, spanning the cities of Caotun, Guoxing, Wufeng, and Taiping. The protected area contains many small, jagged peaks, hence the name.

Description 

Jiujiufeng is located on the north bank of the Dadu River southeast of Taichung City. Geologically, Jiujiufeng is located in the Toukeshan Formation (頭嵙山層), a Pleistocene-era formation primarily composed of gravelly rocks. Since the soil has high permeability, the peaks are easily eroded by rainfall to form the jagged peaks. Despite the terrain, Jiujiufeng still sustains a wide array of plant life, including the rare Reevesia formosana.

The 1999 Jiji earthquake caused many landslides within Jiujiufeng, which uncovered the red laterite surfaces beneath and destroyed much of the original vegetation. The resulting unique landscape prompted the Forestry Bureau to protect it as a nature preservation area (自然保留區) on 22 May 2000.

Hiking 
The trail is accessible from Caotun.

See also 
 Huoyan Mountain

References 

Caotun Township
Landforms of Taichung
Landforms of Nantou County